Henry Corbin (also Corbyn; 1629–1675/76) was an emigrant from England who became a tobacco planter in the Virginia colony and served in both houses of the Virginia General Assembly, in the House of Burgesses representing Lancaster County before the creation of Middlesex County on Virginia's Middle Neck, then on the Governor's Council.

Early life
Corbin was born in 1629 in Warwickshire, the so third child of Sir Thomas Corbin and his wife Winifred Grosvenor. He had four brothers and a sister (Letitia, after whom he would also name his daughter). The eldest brother, Thomas Corbin (b. 1624), married the daughter of Edmund Goodyear and their only child, Margaret married William Lygon of Madrasfield in Worcester County, from whom the senior branch of the English Corbin family descends. Henry Corbin's other brothers were George, Gawin and Charles.

Colonial merchant and planter
In 1654, at the age of 25, he immigrated across the Atlantic Ocean, arriving in the Virginia Colony aboard the ship 'Charity'. Corbin remained active as a merchant after he settled on the Middle Neck . In his marriage contract with Alice Eltonhead Burnham, he gave a bond to secure her property and characterized himself as "of Rappahannock, Virginia, merchant." Corbin also operated tobacco plantations using enslaved labour. In 1660 he and his wife sold 300 acres on Morratico Creek to Raleigh Travers. In 1668, during the lengthy creation of Middlesex County from the part of Lancaster County south of the Rappahannock River, Corbin paid taxes for eighteen tithables, the most on that side.

Officeholder and politician

The governor and council made Corbin a justice of the Lancaster County court in 1657. Lancaster County voters in both 1659 and 1660 elected Corbin as one of their representatives in the House of Burgesses, alongside the county's largest plantation owner, John Carter, Sr., who lived and operated plantations on the Rappahannock's northern shore (with 58 tithables in 1668).

 
In 1661, Corbin mediated a dispute between the Potomac native people and Major General Hammand. He often appears in the court records of both Lancaster County, Westmoreland County and Northumberland County, often suing on creditors' behalf, often against decedents' estates. Some of his land would later be located in Richmond County, the Northern Neck of Virginia being split off from Northunberland County, and eventually Westmoreland, Lancaster and Richmond Counties being created therein

In 1663, Corbin was appointed to the Virginia Governor's Council. He remained on the council until his death in 1676.

Family
Some time before April 5, 1658, Corbin married Alice (Eltonhead), the widow of sometime burgess Rowland Burnham, and whose brother was on the Maryland Govvernor's Council and whose several sisters married men on the Maryland and Virginia Governor' Councils. During the marriage, she bore three sons (Henry, Thomas, and Gawin), and five daughters (Laetitia, Alice, Winifred, Ann, and Frances). Gawin Corbin, like his father, would serve in the House of Burgesses, but represented Middlesex County. His sister (this man's daughter) Frances (1666-1713) married Edmund Jenings (1659-1727) son of British barrister Sir Edmuund Jennings (1626-1691) and Margaret Barkham (1626-1726), and who would become agent for the Northern Neck Proprietary for several years with Thomas Lee, whose brother Richard Lee II married her sister Letitia. However, the widower Jenings would die in disgrace and his property was foreclosed by powerful planter and burgess King Carter (with whom this man served) and by her brother Thomas Corbin. Colonel Lee, like Edmund Jenings, was a military leader, planter, politician, and member of the King's Council of Virginia. Ann married William Tayloe, the nephew of William Tayloe (the immigrant) of King's Creek Plantation and High Sheriff of York County, Virginia, the father of John Tayloe I and progenitor of the Tayloe's of Mount Airy, Richmond County, Virginia.

Death and legacy

Henry Corbin died in Virginia on January 8, 1675. By 1677, his widow married (3rd) Capt. Henry Creyke (or Creeke) In that year, his executores made a claim against Robert Beckingham's estate

References

People from the Borough of North Warwickshire
People of colonial Maryland
Virginia colonial people
House of Burgesses members
1629 births
1676 deaths
People from Lancaster County, Virginia